Sunnmøre District Court was a district court in Møre og Romsdal county, Norway. The court was based in the town of Ålesund. The court existed until 2021. It had jurisdiction over approximately the southern third of the county, except the far southern part, and it includes the municipalities of Ålesund, Giske, Haram, Hareid, Norddal, Skodje, Stordal, Stranda, Sula, Sykkylven, Ulstein and Ørskog. Cases from this court could be appealed to Frostating Court of Appeal. The court was led by the chief judge Kirsti Høegh Bjørneset. This court employed a chief judge, seven other judges, and several prosecutors.

The court was a court of first instance. Its judicial duties were mainly to settle criminal cases and to resolve civil litigation as well as bankruptcy. The administration and registration tasks of the court included death registration, issuing certain certificates, performing duties of a notary public, and officiating civil wedding ceremonies. Cases from this court were heard by a combination of professional judges and lay judges.

History
In 1798, the old Sunnmøre district court was divided into Søre Sunnmøre District Court (based in Volda) and Nordre Sunnmøre District Court (based in Ålesund).  The northern area roughly corresponded to the present day Sunnmøre District Court. The name of the northern court was later changed to simply Sunnmøre District Court. In 1967, the municipalities of Ulstein and Hareid were transferred from the Søre Sunnmøre District Court to the Sunnmøre District Court. On 26 April 2021, this court was merged with the Søre Sunnmøre District Court, Romsdal District Court, and Nordmøre District Court to create the new Møre og Romsdal District Court.

References

Defunct district courts of Norway
Organisations based in Ålesund
1798 establishments in Norway
2021 disestablishments in Norway